Timothy Gray (November 11, 1952 – October 8, 2015) was an American football safety in the National Football League. He was drafted by the St. Louis Cardinals 21st overall in the 1975 NFL Draft. He played college football at Texas A&M.

Gray also played for the Kansas City Chiefs and San Francisco 49ers. He died in 2015 at the age of 62.

References 

1952 births
2015 deaths
American football safeties
Navarro Bulldogs football players
Texas A&M Aggies football players
St. Louis Cardinals (football) players
Kansas City Chiefs players
San Francisco 49ers players
Players of American football from Houston